High Velocity is a 1976 action film that was the only film of director Remi Kramer, who also co-wrote the screenplay.

Plot
An American business executive is kidnapped by a revolutionary guerrilla group in an unnamed Asian nation. Unwilling to meet the terrorist's demands or to use the security forces of the nation, the victim's employer and his wife hire two fun-loving  American expatriate Vietnam veterans to rescue him. Together with their local friend and guide, the trio find out that they are up against an unexpected and deadly enemy.

Cast
Ben Gazzara as Cliff Baumgartner
Britt Ekland as Mrs. Andersen
Paul Winfield as	Watson
Keenan Wynn  as  Mr. Andersen
Alejandro Rey as Alejandro Martel
Victoria Racimo as Dolores
Joonee Gamboa as 	Commander Habagat
 Rita Gomez 	as  Nancy
 Joe Andrade 	as Manong
Liam Dunn 	as Bennett
 Richard O'Brien 	as Beaumont
Stacy Keach, Sr. 	as	Carter
 James Bacon 	as Monroe
 Jojo Juan 	as Celia
 Hernan Robles as a gaol guard
 Kim Ramos as an officer

Production
High Velocity was the only completed film of First Asian Films of California who contracted with Filmways Productions (Philippines) to supply local facilities and crews. Japanese producer Takafumi Ohashi selected Remi Kramer who had previously received a 1971 Clio Award, directed several Marlboro Man commercials and designed the film title design for The Doris Day Show.  Kramer co-wrote the film with Michael Joaquin Parsons (?-September 15, 2013), who had been involved in the Philippine film industry since the 1960s. The cinematographer, Robert Paynter was English and the stunt director, Clem Parsons was Australian. Paynter shot the film in Panavision using Panavision Silent Reflex (PSR) camera, with Superspeed 35, 50, 75, and 100-millimeter lenses to cope with the extensive low light levels at night in the jungle and Manila's Chinatown.  Filming began in 1974 with production completed in 1975.  First Asian Films of California then planned a US$4 million film about General John J. Pershing but the film was never produced.

References

External links

1976 films
1970s action adventure films
20th Century Fox films
American action adventure films
Films about kidnapping
Films scored by Jerry Goldsmith
Films set in Asia
Films about mercenaries
Films shot in the Philippines
American war adventure films
1976 directorial debut films
1970s English-language films
1970s American films